Hypericum minutum is a flowering plant in the genus Hypericum, sect. Adenosepalum.

Similar Species 
The species is closest in appearance and relation to two other Turkish species of Hypericum: H. huber-morathii and H. sechmenii. The biggest differences between the species is in their leaves, flowering times, and pollen form.

References

minutum
Flora of Turkey